Great American Cowboy is the first album by the Western music band Sons of the San Joaquin, released in 1990.  It was independently produced and distributed and primarily contains songs written by or notably recorded by the Sons of the Pioneers.  It was their first and only album to contain original material penned by member Jack Hannah until 1995's From Whence Came the Cowboy.

Track listing

Personnel

Sons of the San Joaquin

Jack Hannah – vocals, rhythm guitar
Joe Hannah – vocals, bass fiddle, whistle
Lon Hannah – vocals, lead guitar, rhythm guitar

Additional personnel

Robert Wagoner – lead guitar, rhythm guitar
"Doc" Denning – fiddle, bass fiddle

Production

Sons of the San Joaquin – producers
Recorded at:
Maximus Recording Studios, Fresno, CA
Nye Morton – engineer, mixer
David M. Graham – photography

External links
Official site

1990 debut albums
Sons of the San Joaquin albums